For the Love of Ada is a 1972 British comedy film directed by Ronnie Baxter and starring Irene Handl, Wilfred Pickles, Barbara Mitchell and Jack Smethurst. It is a spin-off from the television series For the Love of Ada.

Plot
Walter and Ada Bingley (Wilfred Pickles and Irene Handl), an elderly couple, are about to celebrate their first wedding anniversary. To celebrate, their family, friends and neighbours plan a surprise party.

Their daughter Ruth entrusts her husband Leslie Pollitt with the organisation. They hire a traditional club hall for the event.

On the night though Walter and Ada do their own thing and the party goes on without them. With most of the alcohol consumed a traditional knees-up begins. Leslie eventually finds them and drags them in for a meal, but they have already eaten.

Cast
 Irene Handl as Ada Bingley
 Wilfred Pickles as Walter Bingley
 Barbara Mitchell as Ruth Pollitt
 Jack Smethurst as Leslie Pollitt
 Arthur English as Arthur
 Larry Martyn as Brian
 Hilda Braid as Mrs Armitage
 Andria Lawrence as Sandra
 David Collings as Mr Johnson
 John Boxer as the Vicar
 Nancy Nevinson as Elsie Lockwood
 Norman Atkyns as Charlie Nugent
 Donald Bisset as Mr Chapman
 Duggie Brown as Duggie
 Johnnie Wade as Alan
 Veronica Doran as Carol
 Gareth Hunt as the PC
 Nicholas Ram as Anthony Pollitt
 Cecily Hullett as Freda Skinner
 Rose Power, Jean Marlow, Rose Hill and Brian Tully as the Mourners

References

External links

1972 films
1972 comedy films
British comedy films
Films shot at EMI-Elstree Studios
Films based on television series
1970s English-language films
1970s British films